Lane Crawford (HK) Limited is a retail company founded in 1850 operating specialist department stores selling luxury goods in Hong Kong and Mainland China.

Lane Crawford is a part of the Lane Crawford Joyce Group, which also owns the fashion retailer, Joyce Boutique.

History

Early history

In August 1850, two Scots, Thomas Ash Lane and Ninian Crawford opened a shop in a makeshift bamboo structure on the waterfront at the present location of Des Voeux Road. Taking each of their individual surnames, Lane Crawford later occupied a number of retail sites along Des Voeux Road and Queen's Road Central. In the early 1900s, it expanded with stores in Guangzhou and Shanghai in China, and Kobe and Tokyo in Japan. It offered services including a tailor and outfitter, a draper, a provisions dealer, a wine and spirits merchant, an auctioneer of antiques, a baker, a restaurant, as well as a bar.

During the Japanese Occupation of Hong Kong between 1941 and 1945, all Lane Crawford properties and assets were taken over by the Japanese Authorities, who transferred the store's operations to the Japanese chain, Matsuzakaya.

Following damages resulting from the Second Sino-Japanese War, Lane Crawford had to rebuild from scratch, so it began expanding its import-export division from foodstuffs to luxury items such as cosmetics and pearls. By 1975, jewellers accounted for 42 percent of sales.

Present

In 2004, Lane Crawford opened a revamped retail store at IFC Mall. In 2007, the company opened a store at Pacific Place Mall, Hong Kong, focusing on furniture and other lifestyle items. In July 2007, the company returned its presence in Beijing, with the opening of its store in Seasons Place Mall following a HK$300 million investment. The opening of the Beijing store follows the closing of other stores in Hangzhou, Shanghai, and Harbin following a strategy change. During this time, Lane Crawford's focus shifted into becoming specialty department store selling speciality products like haute couture.

In 2012, its second Beijing store was opened at the Yintai Centre. In October 2013, Lane Crawford opened its Shanghai flagship store at Shanghai Times Square. In March 2014, the Chengdu store was opened at Chengdu IFS. In 2014, after 21 years of service, the fashion director of Lane Crawford, Sarah Rutson, left the company. 

In June 2017, Lane Crawford was subject to a significant number of complaints by Chinese consumers following mass cancellations of orders that have already been paid for. Following a meeting with the Consumer Protection Agency of China, the company issued a statement justifying the cancellations of 213 orders, citing erroneous pricing due to a systematic error on their website. 

In 2020, the president of Lane Crawford, Andrew Keith, left the company after 9 years and was replaced by Blondie Tsang. Jennifer Woo is the current CEO of the company.

Awards

 2008: National Retail Federation's International Award
 2009: Association for Retail Environment's award for Store of the Year for the Lane Crawford Seasons Place, Beijing
 2010: WGSN Global Fashion Awards for Outstanding Visual Merchandising
 2011: Racie's Gold Award for International Campaign awarded by the NRF's Retail Advertising Marketing Association
 2015: Super Retailer of the Year in the Hong Kong Retail Industry Trade Awards.

Gallery

Store locations
IFC Mall, Central, Hong Kong, China
Times Square, Causeway Bay, Hong Kong, China
Pacific Place home store, Pacific Place Mall, Admiralty, Hong Kong
Ocean Terminal, Tsim Sha Tsui, Kowloon, Hong Kong
Seasons Place, Xicheng District, Beijing, China
Yintai Centre, Chaoyang District, Beijing, China
Times Square, Huangpu, Shanghai, China
Chengdu IFS, Jinjiang, Chengdu, China

References

External links

Department stores of Hong Kong
Department stores of China
Retail companies established in 1850
Clothing companies of Hong Kong
Companies formerly listed on the Hong Kong Stock Exchange
Hong Kong brands